Cryptantha roosiorum is a species of flowering plant in the borage family known by the common name bristlecone cryptantha.

It is endemic to Inyo County, California, where it is known from only a few occurrences in the northern Inyo Mountains.

It is a small, mat-forming perennial herb just a few centimeters high which grows from a woody caudex rooted in rocky soils. The leaves are up to about a centimeter long, oval to spoon-shaped, and hairy to bristly. The inflorescence is a dense cluster of tiny white flowers with five-lobed white corollas with yellow appendages.

External links
Jepson Manual Treatment - Cryptantha roosiorum
USDA Plants Profile: Cryptantha roosiorum
CalPhotos Photo Gallery

roosiorum
Endemic flora of California
Natural history of Inyo County, California
•
Plants described in 1955